Infurcitinea toechophila is a moth of the  family Tineidae. It is found on the Canary Islands.

The wingspan is 12–20 mm. The forewings are dark chocolate-brown with clearly defined silvery white markings. The hindwings are pale shining greyish.

The larvae possibly feed on lichen.

References

Moths described in 1908
Meessiinae